María Guadalupe Salazar Anaya (born 21 March 1943) is a Mexican politician from the National Action Party. In 2009 she served as Deputy of the LX Legislature of the Mexican Congress representing Tlaxcala.

References

1943 births
Living people
Politicians from Guadalajara, Jalisco
Women members of the Chamber of Deputies (Mexico)
National Action Party (Mexico) politicians
21st-century Mexican politicians
21st-century Mexican women politicians
Deputies of the LX Legislature of Mexico
Members of the Chamber of Deputies (Mexico) for Tlaxcala